Peter Fairley (2 November 1930 – 5 August 1998) was a British science journalist who was the Science Editor for Independent Television News and TV Times magazine the late sixties and early seventies. His name became synonymous with ITN's extensive live coverage of the Apollo moon landing missions.

His daughter is Josephine Fairley, journalist, magazine editor and founder with her husband of Green & Black's chocolate company.

Biography 

His father was a telecommunications engineer. He attended Sutton Valence School, Kent and Sidney Sussex College, Cambridge and he was then the science correspondent for the London Evening Standard and made numerous radio broadcasts in the 1960s. In April 1961, while employed at the Evening Standard, Fairley, based on warnings sent to ships in the Pacific and a hunch, predicted in his column that the U.S.S.R. was about to launch its first manned space flight. The column appeared on the front page of the paper, and two days later, Russia launched Yuri Gagarin into space. Fairley's salary was doubled as a result of his prediction. He was also a familiar face to ITV's younger viewers with regular appearances on Magpie and the children's science fiction series Timeslip as well as science articles in ITV's children's magazine Look-in, and writing books on popular science. He died of cancer aged 67. 

Archive material collected by Fairley during his coverage of space missions became the basis of the Fairley Archive of Space Exploration (FASE)

Further biographical information from the cover of The Conquest of Pain 
Peter Fairley is Science Editor of Independent Television News, TV Times and Capital Radio. He has been reporting science and medicine for more than twenty years, and has written ten books. In 1968, he was chosen as Science Writer of the Year and awarded a Glaxo Travelling Fellowship; the award was used to finance the travelling needed to research this book.

Peter Fairley calls pain "the most fascinating and possibly the most important subject I have ever tackled".

Bibliography

 Magpie's ABC of Space, Independent Television Publications, 1969 
 Man on the Moon, Littlehampton Book Services, 1969  
 Project X: the exciting story of British invention, Mayflower Books 1970 
 Peter Fairley's Space Annual, 1970
 The Conquest of Pain, 1978

Notes

 Peter Fairley of ITN fame is not to be confused with Canada-based science writer Peter Fairley, known in North America for his writing on energy, technology and the environment. Fairley is also a member of the board of directors of the Society of Environmental Journalists.

References

1930 births
1998 deaths
British male journalists
British reporters and correspondents
People educated at Sutton Valence School
Alumni of Sidney Sussex College, Cambridge